Holly Wiles (born March 19, 1971) is an American former soccer player who played as a defender, making one appearance for the United States women's national team.

Career
Hellmuth played for the Lee Lancers in high school, where she was a two-time NSCAA High School All-American. In college, she played for the UMass Minutewomen from 1989 to 1992, where she was a letter-winner. In total, she scored 15 goals and recorded 13 assists in 76 appearances for the Minutewomen. She was an NSCAA and Soccer America First-Team All-American in 1991 and 1992, and All-New England in 1989, 1990, and 1991. She was also a finalist for the Hermann Trophy.

Hellmuth made her only international appearance for the United States on July 27, 1990 in a friendly match against Canada. The match in Winnipeg finished as a 4–1 win for the U.S.

Hellmuth has coached various youth girls' soccer teams, including FCV Ashburn Blast, FC Virginia, McLean Youth Soccer, Loudoun Soccer, and as the assistant for Washington Spirit Academy VA since 2017.

Career statistics

International

References

1971 births
Living people
People from Fairfax Station, Virginia
Soccer players from Virginia
American women's soccer players
United States women's international soccer players
Women's association football defenders
UMass Minutewomen soccer players
American women's soccer coaches
Female association football managers